The 1992 Algerian coup d'état took place on 11 January 1992. Concerned by the FIS victory in the first round of the 1991 Algerian legislative election, the army took action and cancelled the electoral process to prevent the forming of an Islamic state in Algeria. The army forced president Chadli Bendjedid to resign and brought in the exiled Mohamed Boudiaf to serve as the new president. The military argued that they had done this to "safeguard Algeria's republican institutions from political and radical Islamists" and to prevent Algeria from turning into a theocratic state.

Background 
In 1989, the FIS was founded. It was influenced by the Muslim Brotherhood and quickly gained popularity in Algeria, winning the first round of the Algerian legislative election in December 1991 with twice as many votes as the ruling FLN. The FIS had made open threats against the ruling pouvoir, condemning them as unpatriotic and pro-French, as well as financially corrupt. Additionally, FIS leadership was at best divided on the desirability of democracy, and some expressed fears that a FIS government would be, as U.S. Assistant Secretary of State Edward Djerejian put it, "one person, one vote, one time."

Plot 
A secret meeting was held in December 1991 to discuss the options available to the military, attended by all senior generals including Khaled Nezzar, Abdelmalek Guenaizia, leaders of the navy, gendarmerie and security services. They agreed that the FIS's path to victory should be blocked by using constitutional mechanisms rather than by physical force. They also decided that president Chadli Bendjedid had to resign because this would force the suspension of the second round of the election.

Coup 
On 11 January 1992, the army took power and forced president Chadli Bendjedid to resign. Chadli appeared on national television and announced his resignation in a quiet voice: "Given the difficulty and gravity of the current situation, I consider my resignation necessary to protect the unity of the people and the security of the country". He was replaced with a High Council of State. The army then moved onto the streets of Algiers the next day as tanks and troops guarded important locations in the city, and suspended the electoral process. The High Council of State announced the appointment of a HCE as a collective successor to Chadli, comprising Khaled Nezzar, Ali Kafi, Tijani Haddam, Ali Haroun and Mohamed Boudiaf. The exiled politician Mohamed Boudiaf arrived from Morocco after an official absence of 28 years to serve as the new president of Algeria. He was chosen to give the regime a fresh image and an enhanced sense of legitimacy to attract popular support for the regime. The army then rounded up tens of thousands of Muslims who supported the FIS and put them in camps in the middle of the Algerian Desert. John Enteils noted "The Arab world had never before experienced such a genuinely populist expression of democratic aspirations… Yet when the army overturned the whole democratic experiment in January 1992, the United States willingly accepted the results… In short, a democratically elected Islamist government hostile to American hegemonic aspirations in the region… was considered unacceptable in Washington." Mohamed Bouadiaf was assassinated in June 1992.

References 

1992 in Algeria
Military coups in Algeria
1990s coups d'état and coup attempts